"I'm Not Mad" is the debut single from Scottish pop singer Alex Gardner. It was released as a CD single and download on 29 March 2010 in the United Kingdom and Ireland on A&M Records. The song was produced by Xenomania.

Critical reception
Nick Levine of Digital Spy gave the song a positive review stating writing that Gardner's voice is "rich, manly and blessed with an intriguing hint of huskiness to it." The tune was described as "a glossy-yet-gloomy electropop affair, and very much a grower not a shower."

Fraser McAlpine of BBC Chart Blog described the song as pleasant though unmemorable background music that is "neither so offensively irksome to my refined palate that I'm tempted to smash the speakers, or so astonishingly mind-sparklingly brilliant that my productivity shoots through the floor." He follows on to criticize the repetitive nature of the whole affair with "After the first minute or so, nothing happens. We just go round and around on the same eight bar of well-mannered, polite synthpop. Oh sure, there's a breakdown section, but it's not particularly arresting and comes across as a transparent attempt to break things up and then drum up some interest in the return of that bassline again"

Music Video
Mirroring the single cover, the video shows Gardner singing while sitting and walking in a room full of mirrors, while finding a girl walking alone.

Track listing
CD single
 "I'm Not Mad"
 "Superfree"

Chart performance

Release history

References

2010 singles
Alex Gardner (singer) songs
Songs written by Alex Gardner (singer)
Song recordings produced by Xenomania
Songs written by Miranda Cooper
Songs written by Brian Higgins (producer)
Songs written by Tim Powell (producer)
2010 songs
A&M Records singles